Freia (minor planet designation: 76 Freia) is a very large main-belt asteroid. It orbits in the outer part of the asteroid belt and is classified as a Cybele asteroid. Its composition is very primitive and it is extremely dark in color. Freia was discovered by the astronomer Heinrich d'Arrest on October 21, 1862, in Copenhagen, Denmark. It was his first and only asteroid discovery. It is named after the goddess Freyja in Norse mythology.

The sidereal orbital period of this asteroid is commensurable with that of Jupiter, which made it useful for ground-based mass estimates of the giant planet. A shape model for the asteroid was published by Stephens and Warner (2008), based upon lightcurve data. They found two possible solutions for the spin axis, with the preferred solution in ecliptic coordinates being (λ, β) =.

References

External links
 
 

Cybele asteroids
Freia
Freia
P-type asteroids (Tholen)
X-type asteroids (SMASS)
18621021